Robert Chuter is an Australian theatre director, film director, producer, writer, and actor.

Early life
Robert John Chuter was born on 23 April 1964  in Carlton, Victoria, Australia, the only son of Rita Spalding and British emigrant Harry Chuter.

Career
In 1976, Chuter worked with a touring company led by Lindsay Kemp and cites the experience as one of his inspirations for becoming involved in theatre direction. His interest in film direction originated while he was working in a bookstore, when he was encouraged to create some Super 8 film by Agnes Dobson, the veteran Australian stage and silent screen actress. He was educated at RMIT, Victorian College of the Arts - School of Drama, St. Martin's Theatre School, Melbourne Theatre Company Youth Theatre, and graduated from the prestigious Swinburne Film and Television School in 1983 winning best production for his graduation short The Mortal Coil.

He founded the Performing Arts Projects (later to become Fly-On-The-Wall Theatre) in Melbourne with playwright Daniel Lillford in 1985.

Between 2005 and 2008, Chuter worked in London's West End.

Stage actor
Oh Dad, Poor Dad, Mamma's Hung You in the Closet and I'm Feelin' So Sad (Monash)
The Seagull (Guild Theatre, 1976)
The Polish Girl (Playbox Theatre, 1977)
Plague Island (La Mama Theatre, 1986)

Stage director
Johnny So Long (Arena Theatre, 1976)
Curtains (Grant Street Theatre, 1977)
Esther (Guild Theatre, 1978)
The Spalding Family Album (La Mama Theatre, 1978 - Season 1)
The Spalding Family Album (La Mama Theatre, 1978 - Season 2)
Two Tigers (La Mama Theatre, 1979)
The Spalding Family Album (Playbox Theatre, 1979 - Season 3)
The Spalding Family Album (Universal Theatre I, 1980 - Season 4)
Upside Down at the Bottom of the World (Queensland Theatre Company, 1981)
The Murderer's Song (La Mama Theatre, 1981)
Nijinsky (Universal Theatre I, 1982)
They Shoot Horses, Don't They? (Grant Street Theatre, 1983)
Isadora (Universal Theatre, 1984)
The Seagull (New Theatre, 1985)
Rebel Without A Cause (Union Theatre, Melbourne University, 1985)
Quintessence (La Mama Theatre, 1987)
Sal (La Mama Theatre, 1987)
Music of Orpheus and Other Short Pieces (La Mama Theatre, 1987)
Restoring the Picture of Dorian Gray (La Mama Theatre, 1988)
Shipwreck! (La Mama Theatre, 1988)
The Hive (La Mama Theatre, 1989)
The Death of Peter Pan (La Mama Theatre, 1989 - Season 1)  
The Death of Peter Pan (Universal Theatre II, 1989 - Season 2)
Kisses for Vera (La Mama Theatre, 1989)
In Angel Gear (Irene Mitchell Studio, St. Martin's Theatre, 1990)
Figures in Glass (Irene Mitchell Studio, St. Martin's Theatre, 1990)
Loving Friends (Rippon Lea, 1991 - Season 1)
I've Danced With A Girl Who Danced With the Prince of Wales (Rippon Lea Ballroom, 1991)
Loving Friends (Rippon Lea, 1992 - Season 2)
La Miracle de la Rose (Old Melbourne Gaol, 1992 - Season 1)
Heights (La Mama Theatre, 1992)
Good Morning, Midnight! (La Mama Theatre, 1993)
Storm Is Her Name... (Mietta's, 19983)
La Miracle de la Rose (Belvoir Street Theatre Upstairs, 1993 - Season 2)
An Indian Summmer (Rippon Lea, 1994)
Little Lord Fauntleroy (Rippon Lea, 1994)
Sunset Children (La Mama Theatre, 1994) 
Lady Chatterley's Lover (Rippon Lea, 1995 - Season 1)
The Yellow Book (Mietta's, 1995)
Perks (Mietta's, 1995)
Lady Chatterley's Lover (Rippon Lea/Botanic Gardens, 1996 - Season 2)
Lady Chatterley's Lover (Vaucluse House, Sydney, 1996 - Season 3)
A Singular Man (Old Treasury Building, 1996)
Anne of Green Gables (Rippon Lea, 1996 - Season 1) 
The White Rose and the Blue (Council Chambers, Melbourne Town Hall, 1997)
The Great Gatsby (Rippon Lea, 1997)
Seven Little Australians (Rippon Lea, 1997) 
The Turn of the Screw (Rippon Lea, 1999)
Anne of Green Gables (Tranby House, Perth, 1999 - Season 2)
Miles Franklin and the Rainbow's End (Theatreworks, 2000 - Season 1)
Miles Franklin and the Rainbow's End (The Blue Room, Perth, 2000 - Season 2) 
Homme Fatale (Theatreworks, 2000 - Season 1)
Homme Fatale (The Blue Room, Perth, 2000 - Season 2)
The Singing Forest (Theatreworks, 2001)
Women in Love (Rippon Lea, 2002)
The Murderer's Barbeque (La Mama Theatre on location in Elwood, 2003)
A Thousand and One Night Stands (Theatreworks, 2004)
Homme Fatale (Theatreworks, 2004 - Season 3)
Moments in Time - The Colonial (Dantes, 2004)
The Lost (Chapel Off Chapel, 2004)
Five Minute (The Butterfly Club, 2004)
Fresh Pleasures (Pleasance Theatre, London, 2005)
Homme Fatale (Pleasance Theatre, London, 2005 - Season 4)
Shakin' The Blues Away (The Butterfly Club, 2005 - Season 1)
Shakin' The Blues Away (The Statement Lounge, Sydney, 2005 - Season 2)
Falling So Slowly... (Irene Mitchell Studio, St. Martin's, 2005)
Life As A Springer Show (Fairfax Studio, Arts Centre, 2006)
Do You Know The Way to Ballarat? (The Butterfly Club, 2006)
Half A Person: My Life As Told By The Smiths (Fowler's Live, Adelaide, 2006 - Season 1)
Oblomov's Dream (Jermyn Street Theatre, London, 2006)
The Object of Desire (La Mama Theatre, 2007)
Half A Person: My Life As Told By The Smiths (Newtown Theatre, Sydney, 2007 - Season 2)
Almost (Fairfax Studio, Arts Centre, 2007)
Exploration (PlaySix, 2008)
Dimboola (La Mama Theatre, 2008)
The Needle and the Damage Done (La Mama Courthouse, 2008)
Thieving Boy/Like Stars in My Hands (La Mama Courthouse, 2008)
Tipping Point (Fairfax Studio, Arts Centre, 2008)
The Dream Children (La Mama Courthouse, 2009)
Defaced: The Exhibition (Guildford Lane Gallery, 2010)
Half A Person: My Life As Told By The Smiths (Chapel Off Chapel, 2010 - Season 3)
Half A Person: My Life As Told By The Smiths (Chapel Off Chapel, 2010 - Season 4)
The Choir (Brightspace Gallery, 2010)
All I Will Ever Be (Chapel Off Chapel, 2012 - Season 1)
All I Will Ever Be (Chapel Off Chapel, 2012 - Season 2)
The Death of Peter Pan (Chapel Off Chapel, 2013 - Season 3)
November Spawned A Monster (Old Fitzroy Theatre, Sydney, 2014)
Teleny(Chapel Off Chapel, 2014)
The Fastest Clock in the Universe (Chapel Off Chapel, 2015)

Stage producer
Heeding advice given to him by the British film director Ken Russell, whom he met during his work directing the opera Madam Butterfly in Melbourne, Chuter has been diverse in his stage productions: 

Among the productions as producer have been:

The Polish Girl (Playbox Theatre, 1977)
Stravanganaza (Napier Street Theatre, 1992)
No Room for Dreamers (La Mama Theatre/Spoleto Fringe Festival, 1986)
Life (Randall Theatre, St. Martins Theatre, 1991)
The Secret Garden (Rippon Lea, 1994)
Anne of Green Gables (Rippon Lea, 1996)
Fresh Pleasures (Pleasance Theatre, London, 2005)
Homme Fatale  (Pleasance Theatre, London, 2005)
Trybe: An Opera in Paint (Chapel Off Chapel, 2013)

Film
The 2015 film release The Dream Children was directed and co-produced by Chuter. He had previously directed a stage version, written by Julia Britton, for Fly-On-The-Wall Theatre in 2009.

In 2017, Chuter commenced filming his second feature film A Beautiful Request, based on the stage plays by his old friend and colleague Dubai-based playwright Alex Broun.

References

Sources
Jones, Liz with Burstall, Betty & Garner, Helen – La Mama: The Story of a Theatre, McPhee Gribble/Penguin Books, 1988 p. 11, 78, 79, 80, 87, 100, 104, 107, 108
Steel, Brett (editor) – Melborn08’s Playspotting, Melbourne Writers Theatre/Ligare, 2008 p. 4, 5, 9, 14, 59
Breslin, Anthony – "Frantic Bloom", Melbourne Books, 2010 p. 5, 227
Martinetti, Ron –  The James Dean Story, Pinnacle Books, 1975 p. 177
Radic, Leonard -"Contemporary Australian Drama'", Brandl & Schlesinger, 2006 p. 285
Patersib, Barbara - "Renegades - Australia's First Film School from Swinburne to VCA", Helican Press,  1996 p. 184

External links 

Australian male stage actors
Australian theatre directors
Australian film directors
Australian film producers
Living people
People from Victoria (Australia)
Victorian College of the Arts alumni
Date of birth missing (living people)
Year of birth missing (living people)